Cypress Creek is a stream in Ripley County in the U.S. state of Missouri. It is a tributary of Logan Creek.

Cypress Creek most likely was so named on account of cypress trees in the area.

See also
List of rivers of Missouri

References

Rivers of Ripley County, Missouri
Rivers of Missouri